Nebularia edentula, the toothless mitre, is a species of sea snail, a marine gastropod mollusc in the family Mitridae, the miters or miter snails.

Description
The shell size varies between 20 mm and 40 mm

Distribution
This species is distributed in the Indian Ocean along Aldabra and the Mascarene Basin

References

 Cernohorsky W. O. (1976). The Mitrinae of the World. Indo-Pacific Mollusca 3(17) page(s): 469
 Drivas, J. & M. Jay (1988). Coquillages de La Réunion et de l'île Maurice
 Filmer R.M. (2001). A Catalogue of Nomenclature and Taxonomy in the Living Conidae 1758 - 1998. Backhuys Publishers, Leiden. 388pp
 Tucker J.K. (2009). Recent cone species database. 4 September 2009 Edition

External links
 Gastropods.com : Mitra (Dibaphus) edentula; accessed : 11 December 2010

edentula
Gastropods described in 1823